Field marshal  (or field-marshal, abbreviated as FM) is a five-star honorary rank in the Pakistan Army awarded by the Islamic Republic of Pakistan to chief of army staff in recognition of distinguished service such as a major victory in a combat battle (a wartime victory). It is the highest rank in Pakistan uniformed services that ranks above general as well as air chief marshal and below none. Although it is a current and authorized rank with a pay grade of "Apex Scale", it has been used one-off throughout its history and no Pakistani armed officer presently holds it, with the erstwhile and last field marshal being Ayub Khan, who promoted himself to the rank in 1965. It comes with no additional powers and pay grade, but an honorary rank with a NATO's equivalent rank code OF-10. It is equivalent to fleet admiral, and while it is an ordinarily senior rank in Pakistan army, it can be refer as five-star general  "standard rank scale" to distinguish it from other military insignias.

Although a five-star field marshal assumes no additional power, but it could be a difficult task for government to combat the unconstitutional political movement and the use of unsanctioned power by a military dictator, especially by a field marshal.

History
Since Pakistan became a sovereign state, the five-star field marshal rank was only given in once to a Pakistani army general Ayub Khan.

Appointment
The appointment of five-star field marshal is made through an appeal submitted for review request by the Prime minister of Pakistan in a joint effort with the president and defence ministry to the supreme court or high court for constitutional orders under certain rules and regulations, although the president exercises the power of the commander-in-chief and prime minister rules national assembly.

Statutory limits
Although five-star field marshal rank was only given once, there are no enough evidences that could establish statutory limits of a field marshal. However, the law of Pakistan restricts the use of unsanctioned power by a field marshal or general and can be constraint under a certain constitutional amendment.

References

Pakistan Army ranks
Pakistan Army
Pakistan Army
Pakistani generals